Duke Philip Sigismund of Brunswick-Wolfenbüttel (July 1, 1568 in Hessen am Fallstein – 19 March 1623 in Iburg) was a Lutheran administrator of the Prince-Bishopric of Verden and Osnabrück (1591–1623) son of Julius, Duke of Brunswick and Lunenburg, Prince of Wolfenbüttel and Hedwig of Brandenburg.

References

Philip Sigismund
Philip Sigismund
Philip Sigismund
1568 births
1623 deaths
Sons of monarchs